The 2005 Catalan motorcycle Grand Prix was the sixth round of the 2005 MotoGP Championship. It took place on the weekend of 10–12 June 2005 at the Circuit de Catalunya located in Montmeló, Catalonia, Spain.

MotoGP classification

250 cc classification

125 cc classification

Championship standings after the race (motoGP)

Below are the standings for the top five riders and constructors after round six has concluded.

Riders' Championship standings

Constructors' Championship standings

 Note: Only the top five positions are included for both sets of standings.

References

Catalan motorcycle Grand Prix
Catalan
Catalan Motorcycle Grand Prix
motorcycle